Willem Scholten (1 June 1927 – 1 January 2005) was a Dutch politician of the defunct Christian Historical Union (CHU) party and later the Christian Democratic Appeal (CDA) party and economist. He was granted the honorary title of Minister of State on 1 July 1997.

Scholten attended a Gymnasium in Deventer from May 1939 until June 1945 and applied at the National Tax Academy in Rotterdam in July 1945 and simultaneously applied at the University of Amsterdam in July 1945 majoring in Tax law and obtaining a Bachelor of Laws degree in June 1947 before graduating with a Master of Laws degree in July 1951. Scholten worked as a civil servant for Tax and Customs Administration of the Ministry of Finance from September 1951 until June 1963.

Scholten was elected as a Member of the House of Representatives after the election of 1963, taking office on 5 June 1963 serving as a frontbencher and spokesperson for Finances and deputy spokesperson for Justice and Economic Affairs. After the election of 1971 Scholten was appointed as State Secretary for Finance in the Cabinet Biesheuvel I, taking office on 14 July 1971. The Cabinet Biesheuvel I fell just one year later on 19 July 1972 and continued to serve in a demissionary capacity until the first cabinet formation of 1972 when it was replaced by the caretaker Cabinet Biesheuvel II with Scholten continuing as State Secretary for Finance, taking office on 9 August 1972. After the election of 1972 Scholten returned as a Member of the House of Representatives, taking office on 19 December 1972 but he was still serving in the cabinet and because of dualism customs in the constitutional convention of Dutch politics he couldn't serve a dual mandate he subsequently resigned as State Secretary for Finance on 19 March 1973. Following the second cabinet formation of 1972 Scholten was not giving a cabinet post in the new Cabinet Den Uyl and he continued to serve in the House of Representatives as a frontbencher and spokesperson for Finances and Economic Affairs and deputy spokesperson for Justice and International trade. Scholten was selected as a Member of the European Parliament and dual served in those positions, taking office on 25 June 1973. In February 1976 Scholten was nominated as Member of the Council of State, he resigned as a Member of the House of Representatives and a Member of the European Parliament the same day he was installed as a Member of the Council of State, taking office on 1 March 1976. Scholten was appointed as Minister of Defence in the Cabinet Van Ag-Wiegel following the resignation of Roelof Kruisinga, taking office on 8 March 1978. In August 1980 Scholten was nominated as Vice-President of the Council of State, he resigned as Minister of Defence on 25 August 1980 and was installed as Vice-President, serving from 1 October 1980 until 1 July 1997.

Scholten semi-retired after spending 34 years in national politics and became active in the private sector and public sector and occupied numerous seats as a corporate director and nonprofit director on several boards of directors and supervisory boards (Institute of International Relations Clingendael, Society for Statistics and Operations Research, Royal Library of the Netherlands, SEO Economic Research and the Carnegie Foundation) and served on several state commissions and councils on behalf of the government (Public Pension Funds PFZW, Statistics Netherlands and the Public Pension Funds APB).

Scholten was known for his abilities as a negotiator and consensus builder.

Decorations

References

External links

Official
  Mr. W. (Willem) Scholten Parlement & Politiek

 

1927 births
2005 deaths
Christian Historical Union MEPs
Christian Democratic Appeal politicians
Christian Historical Union politicians
Dutch corporate directors
Dutch fiscal jurists
Dutch members of the Dutch Reformed Church
Dutch nonprofit directors
Honorary Order of the Yellow Star
Grand Crosses of the Order of the Crown (Belgium)
Grand Crosses with Star and Sash of the Order of Merit of the Federal Republic of Germany
Grand Officers of the Order of Orange-Nassau
Grand Officiers of the Légion d'honneur
Knights of the Order of the Netherlands Lion
Ministers of Defence of the Netherlands
Ministers of State (Netherlands)
Members of the Council of State (Netherlands)
Members of the House of Representatives (Netherlands)
MEPs for the Netherlands 1958–1979
State Secretaries for Finance of the Netherlands
Tax collectors
People from Deventer
People from Leidschendam
Protestant Church Christians from the Netherlands
Vice-presidents of the Council of State (Netherlands)
University of Amsterdam alumni
20th-century Dutch civil servants
20th-century Dutch economists
20th-century Dutch jurists
20th-century Dutch politicians